Vincenzo Arangio-Ruiz (Naples 1884 - Rome 1964)  was a distinguished Italian jurist and Roman Law scholar, who also held the post of Minister of Justice and Minister of Education. Among his most famous works on Roman Law are: Storia del diritto romano (1937) and,  Istituzioni di diritto romano (1957).

Arangio-Ruiz was the minister of justice in the government of Ivanoe Bonomi and Ferruccio Parri. He held the post from June 1944 to December 1945.

References

External links

1884 births
1964 deaths
Jurists from Naples
Education ministers of Italy
Bonomi III Cabinet
Members of the National Council (Italy)
Politicians from Naples
Italian Ministers of Justice
Members of the Royal Academy of Belgium
Manifesto of the Anti-Fascist Intellectuals
20th-century jurists
Corresponding Fellows of the British Academy